Colonel George Anthony Legh-Keck  (1774–1860) was a British MP in the Georgian era who owned landed estates in Leicestershire and Lancashire.

Early life
Legh-Keck was born at Stoughton Grange, Leicestershire, the only surviving son of Anthony James Keck, MP for Newton, and Elizabeth (née Legh), second daughter and co-heiress of Peter Legh (1706–1792), of Lyme Hall, Cheshire. His wife, Elizabeth Atherton, inherited Bank Hall in Bretherton, Lancashire, which he renovated with help from the architect George Webster in 1832–33.

Career
Legh-Keck was returned to parliament five times as MP for Leicestershire between 1797 and 1831.

Commissioned as an officer in the Leicestershire Yeomanry Cavalry in 1803, he later served as Lieutenant-Colonel Commandant of the regiment until his death in 1860. Legh-Keck, in a portrait from 1851, held a broad-topped shako sporting a 12-inch white plume held in place by bronze chin scales.

In 1805 Legh-Keck bought the lordship of the manor of Houghton-on-the-Hill which remained in the Lilford family until 1913.

His younger cousin was William Legh, 1st Baron Newton, who previously served as a Member of Parliament.

Personal life

In 1802, Legh-Keck married his cousin Elizabeth Atherton, second daughter and co-heiress of Robert Atherton, MP, of Atherton Hall, Lancashire and Henrietta Maria Legh of Lyme. In 1832, he engaged the architect, George Webster to design extensions and renovate Bank Hall, her ancestral mansion at Bretherton, Lancashire, also installing box pews at St Mary's Church, Tarleton, where he was patron of the living. His wife, Elizabeth Legh-Keck, died at Bank Hall in 1837 as did he aged 86 on 4 September 1860, being buried at Stoughton Church.

The Legh-Kecks had no children, so the Bank Hall estates passed to Thomas Atherton Powys (3rd Baron Lilford) and the Stoughton estate to his wife's nephew, Major Henry Littleton Powys-Keck. Thomas Littleton Powys, 4th Baron Lilford, who inherited Bank Hall from his father, the 3rd Baron Lilford, on 15 March 1861 auctioned its contents in April 1861 to cover death duties.

Lord Lilford then removed to his family seat at Lilford Hall, Northamptonshire, leaving Bank Hall empty and leasing it out.

Collections

Legh-Keck collected stuffed animals and birds and sets of horns from species worldwide. He also owned a collection of classical-style statuettes and casts of figures by the sculptor Antonio Canova.

In 1830, the artist Thomas Phillips painted a portrait of Legh-Keck which now is at the Leicester Arts and Museums Service Collection.

A large mural painted on the wall of the drawing room at Bank Hall, subject unknown was lost when the roof of the west wing collapsed in the 1980s.

There is a collection of Colonel Legh-Keck's accoutrements held by the Leicestershire Yeomanry Association.

See also
Leighs of West Hall, High Legh
Leghs of Adlington
Earl of Chichester (1644 creation)
Baron Leigh
Leigh baronets

References

External links 
 
 "LEGH-KECK, George Anthony (1774-1860)" at historyofparliamentonline.org

1784 births
1860 deaths
Military personnel from Leicestershire
People from Stoughton, Leicestershire
People from the Borough of Chorley
People educated at Eton College
Alumni of Christ Church, Oxford
Members of the Parliament of Great Britain for Leicestershire
Members of the Parliament of the United Kingdom for Leicestershire
British MPs 1796–1800
UK MPs 1806–1807
UK MPs 1807–1812
UK MPs 1812–1818
UK MPs 1818–1820
UK MPs 1820–1826
UK MPs 1826–1830
UK MPs 1830–1831
Leicestershire Yeomanry officers
Bank Hall